The 2000 United States presidential election in Florida took place on November 7, 2000, as part of the nationwide presidential election. Florida, a swing state, had a major recount dispute that took center stage in the election. The outcome of the 2000 United States presidential election was not known for more than a month after balloting because of the extended process of counting and recounting Florida's presidential ballots. State results tallied on election night gave 246 electoral votes to Republican nominee Texas Governor George W. Bush and 255 to Democratic nominee Vice President Al Gore, with New Mexico (5), Oregon (7), and Florida (25) too close to call that evening. Gore won New Mexico and Oregon over the following few days; but the result in Florida was to be decisive, regardless of how those two states had voted.

After an intense recount process and the United States Supreme Court's decision in Bush v. Gore, Bush won Florida’s electoral votes by a margin of only 537 votes out of almost six million cast (0.009%) and, as a result, became the president-elect. The process was extremely divisive and led to calls for electoral reform in Florida. Bush became the first Republican to win the White House without carrying Palm Beach County since the county's founding in 1909. If Gore had won the recount, then he would have won the election with a total of 292 electoral votes, and Bush would have lost with 246 electoral votes.

The final official Florida count gave the victory to Bush by 537 votes, making it by percentage not only the tightest race of the campaign (New Mexico was decided by 366 votes but has a much smaller population, representing a 0.061% margin), but also the closest in any United States presidential election ever. , this is the last election in which the Democratic candidate won Pasco County or Hernando County. It was also the first time the Democratic candidate won Orange County since Franklin D. Roosevelt in 1944.

Background

Election fairness was a major problem known to Floridians in the 1990s; for example, the 1997 Miami mayoral election was tainted by scandal. According to The Palm Beach Post, "State lawmakers decided to weed out felons and other ineligible voters in 1998 after a Miami mayoral election was overturned because votes had been cast by the convicted and the dead."

This initiative occurred without sufficient protection of voting rights. In particular, from summer 1999 to spring 2000, Florida's voter list was subject to an unusually high number of problems. "The state’s highest officials responsible for ensuring efficiency, uniformity, and fairness in the election failed to fulfill their responsibilities." The U.S. Commission on Civil Rights found that an "overall lack of leadership in protecting voting rights was largely responsible for the broad array of problems in Florida during the 2000 election."

The 2001 book Stupid White Men and other books described allegations of efforts to deny black citizens in Florida the right to vote. As a result of the state's contract with Database Technologies, "173,000 registered voters in Florida were permanently wiped off the voter rolls." Even an elections supervisor in Madison County was barred from voting; she and others "tried to get the state to rectify the problem, but their pleas fell on deaf ears."

Campaign

Initially, Florida had been considered fertile territory for Republicans. It was governed by Jeb Bush, a staunch conservative and George W. Bush's brother. Nonetheless, Republicans put significant advertising resources into the state, and later polls indicated that the state was very much in play as late as September 2000. Some late momentum for Gore and his Jewish running mate Joe Lieberman may have come from southern Florida's significant Jewish population. Voters from reliably Democratic states in the Northeast had also been migrating to Florida since the 1950s. The state's electorate was becoming more diverse in general, with growing Asian and Hispanic immigrant populations.

Meanwhile, there was a heavy backlash in the Cuban-American population against Democrats during the Elian Gonzalez dispute, during which Janet Reno, President Bill Clinton’s Attorney General, ordered the six-year-old Cuban refugee to be returned to Cuba. The Democrats’ share of the Cuban-American vote dropped dramatically after 1996.

In late October, one poll found that Gore was leading Bush and third parties by 44–42–4 among registered voters and 46–42–4 among likely voters, but that poll had a margin of error of four percentage points, making the race too close to call.

On election day itself, the extent of the mix-ups in the electoral rolls was such that "in a number of precincts in Florida's inner cities, the polling locations were heavily fortified with police."

Recount
The Florida election was closely scrutinized after Election Day. Due to the narrow margin of the original vote count, Florida Election Code 102.141 mandated a statewide machine recount, which began the day after the election. It was ostensibly completed on November 10 in the 66 Florida counties that used vote-counting machines and reduced Bush's lead to 327 votes. According to legal analyst Jeffrey Toobin, later analysis showed that a total of 18 counties—accounting for a quarter of all votes cast in Florida—did not carry out the legally mandated machine recount, but "No one from the Gore campaign ever challenged this view" that the machine recount had been completed. Once the closeness of the election in Florida was clear, both the Bush and Gore campaigns organized themselves for the ensuing legal process. On November 9, the Bush campaign announced they had hired George H. W. Bush's former Secretary of State James Baker and Republican political consultant Roger Stone to oversee their legal team, and the Gore campaign hired Bill Clinton's former Secretary of State Warren Christopher.

Results

Florida was the second of the 50 states (after Louisiana) to report its official results to the federal government (in a Certificate of Ascertainment submitted to the National Archivist, the manner prescribed for presidential elections).

Results by county

Counties that flipped from Democratic to Republican
Calhoun (Largest city: Blountstown)
Citrus (Largest city: Homosassa Springs)
Dixie (Largest city: Cross City)
Franklin (Largest city: Eastpoint)
Gilchrist (Largest city: Trenton)
Glades (Largest city: Moore Haven)
Gulf (Largest city: Port St. Joe)
Hamilton (Largest city: Jasper)
Hendry (Largest city: Clewiston)
Hillsborough (Largest city: Tampa)
Levy (Largest city: Williston)
Madison (Largest city: Madison)
Okeechobee (Largest city: Okeechobee)
Putnam (Largest city: Palatka)
Sumter (Largest city: The Villages)
Taylor (Largest city: Perry)
Wakulla (Largest city: Sopchoppy)

Counties that flipped from Republican to Democratic
Orange (Largest city: Orlando)

By congressional district
Bush won 12 of 23 congressional districts. Gore won 11, including three that elected Republicans.

Electors

Technically, the voters of Florida cast their ballots for electors, representatives to the Electoral College.  In 2000, Florida was allocated 25 electors because it had 23 congressional districts and 2 senators. All candidates who appear on the ballot or qualify to receive write-in votes must submit a list of 25 electors who pledge to vote for their candidate and his or her running mate. Whoever wins the most votes in the state is awarded all 25 electoral votes. Their chosen electors then vote for president and vice president. Although electors are pledged to their candidate and running mate, they are not obligated to vote for them. An elector who votes for someone other than his or her candidate is known as a faithless elector.

The electors of each state and the District of Columbia met on December 18, 2000, to cast their votes for president and vice president. The Electoral College itself never meets as one body. Instead, the electors from each state and the District of Columbia met in their respective capitols.

The following were the members of the Electoral College from the state. All were pledged to and voted for George W. Bush and Dick Cheney:
 Alred S. Austin
 Deborah L. Brooks
 Armando Codina
 Maria De La Milera
 Sandra M. Faulkner
 Thomas C. Feeney III
 Feliciano M. Foyo
 Jeanne Barber Godwin
 Dawn Guzzetta
 Cynthia M. Handley
 Adam W. Herbert
 Al Hoffman
 Glenda E. Hood
 Carole Jean Jordan
 Charles W. Kane
Mel Martinez
 John M. McKay
 Dorsey C. Miller
 Berta J. Moralejo
 H. Gary Morse
 Marsha Nippert
 Darryl K. Sharpton
 Tom Slade
 John Thrasher
 Robert L. Woody

Film
 Fahrenheit 9/11
 Recount is a made-for-TV political drama about the 2000 US Presidential election. The show was written by Danny Strong, directed by Jay Roach, and produced by Kevin Spacey (who also stars in the film). It premiered on HBO on May 25, 2008, and the DVD was released on August 19, 2008.
 Orwell Rolls in His Grave

Notes

References

Bibliography
 
 Keating, Dan and Balz, Dan. ‘Florida Recounts Would Have Favored Bush But Study Finds Gore Might Have Won Statewide Tally of All Uncounted Ballots.’ The Washington Post, published Nov. 12, 2001.
 See also :Category: Books about the 2000 United States presidential election

External links
 Bush v. Gore
 Presidential Election Law

 
Florida
United States presidential elections in Florida